Events in the year 1829 in Bolivia.

Incumbents 
 President:
 Pedro Blanco Soto (provisional: until 1 January)
 José Miguel de Velasco (acting: 1 January – 24 May)
 Andrés de Santa Cruz (starting 24 May)
 Vice President:
 José Ramón de Loayza (provisional: until 1 January)
 Vacant (1 January – 24 May)
 José Miguel de Velasco (designate: 1 January – 24 May)
 José Miguel de Velasco (starting 24 May)

Events

January 
 1 January – President Pedro Blanco Soto is assassinated in the La Recoletta convent; at six days in office, he becomes the president with the shortest term served. He is succeeded by José Miguel de Velasco, who serves as president pending the arrival of Andrés de Santa Cruz.

May 
 24 May – Andrés de Santa Cruz takes office as the 6th president of Bolivia. Velasco becomes the 2nd vice president.

Births

Deaths 
 1 January – Pedro Blanco Soto, 5th president of Bolivia (b. 1795)

Citations

Bibliography 

 
1800s in Bolivia
Bolivia
Bolivia
Years of the 19th century in Bolivia